British Airways Helicopters was a British helicopter airline from 1964 to 1986.

History

Starting in 1947, British European Airways (BEA) had operated a Helicopter Experiment Unit. It initially operated a fleet of five helicopters sourced from the United States - three Sikorsky S-51s and two Bell 47s.

The unit operated timetabled mail services in East Anglia during 1948 using their Westland-Sikorsky S51s. A scheduled passenger service was operated during 1950 between Cardiff (Pengam Moors), Wrexham and Liverpool (Speke), also utilising the S-51s. In June 1951, BEA introduced helicopter services between Northolt Aerodrome, Hay Mills Rotor Station in Birmingham, and London Heathrow, operated by a pair of S51s. These services were followed in 1954 by a passenger service between Southampton Eastleigh Airport, Heathrow and Northolt, using leased Bristol 171 helicopters. The 1955 passenger service was flown between Birmingham, Heathrow and Gatwick Airport, again with the Bristol 171s.

A separate company was formed in 1964 as BEA Helicopters Limited and operated the first service between Penzance and the Scilly Islands on 1 May 1964 with a Sikorsky S-61. The airline later expanded into offshore oil support flights from July 1965. Operations from Aberdeen started in July 1967 and in 1971 from Sumburgh. With the change of name of the parent on 31 March 1974 the airline was renamed British Airways Helicopters. In 1981, the airline bought six Boeing Vertol BV-234 Chinooks for use on the offshore oil support flights.

The company was involved in setting up the Airlink high-frequency helicopter shuttle service between Gatwick and Heathrow airports in 1978.  It was responsible for engineering and maintenance of the BAA-owned helicopter and for providing the flight crew. Cabin crew were from British Caledonian as was passenger handling at Gatwick. Heathrow handling was by British Airways.

In 1986, the airline was sold by British Airways to Robert Maxwell's Maxwell Aviation and renamed British International Helicopters. The successor company still operated the Penzance to Isles of Scilly route forty years after it was first scheduled, until it was cancelled in 2012.

Aircraft operated
 1964–86 Sikorsky S-61
 1968–84 Agusta-Bell 206 JetRanger
 1974–81 Sikorsky S-58T
 1978–83 Bell 212
 1980–86 Boeing Vertol BV-234
 1979–86 Sikorsky S-76
 1982–86 Westland 30
 1983–86 Aerospatiale AS.332L Super Puma

Helicopter Experimental Unit
 Bell 47 
 Bristol 171
 Sikorsky S-51
 Sikorsky S-61
 Westland Sikorsky WS-55

Accidents and incidents

All crew and passengers were rescued but the helicopter sank and had to be recovered from the sea bed.
On 16 July 1983 a Sikorsky S-61N (G-BEON) crashed on approach to St. Mary's, Isles of Scilly with the loss of 19 passengers and one crew member. 
All crew and passengers were rescued by other helicopters and boats. Although not damaged in the accident the helicopter sank after 85 minutes. The aircraft was recovered for post accident investigation and later refurbished to fly again.

See also
 List of defunct airlines of the United Kingdom

References
Notes

Bibliography

External links

Competition Commission Report

Defunct airlines of the United Kingdom
Defunct helicopter airlines
British International Helicopters
British European Airways
Airlines disestablished in 1986
Airlines established in 1964